Adam Buddle (1662–1715) was an English cleric and botanist. 
Born at Deeping St James, a small village near Peterborough, Buddle was educated at Woodbridge School and St Catharine's College, Cambridge, where he gained a BA in 1681, and an MA four years later. Buddle was eventually ordained into the Church of England, obtaining a living at North Fambridge, near Maldon, Essex, in 1703. His life between graduation and ordination remains obscure, although it is known he lived in or around Hadleigh, Suffolk, that he established a reputation as an authority on bryophytes, and that he married Elizabeth Eveare in 1695, with whom he had two children. Buddle compiled a new English Flora, completed in 1708, but it was never published; the original manuscript is preserved as part of the Sloane collection at the Natural History Museum, London. Appointed Reader at Gray's Inn chapel, Buddle died there in 1715 and was buried at the church of St Andrew, Holborn.
 
Buddle was commemorated by Linnaeus, who named the genus Buddleja in his honour.

References

1662 births
1715 deaths
Botanists with author abbreviations
People from the Deepings
Alumni of St Catharine's College, Cambridge
17th-century English botanists
17th-century English clergy
18th-century English Anglican priests
18th-century British botanists